Claudia Hoffmann-Timm (born 5 April 1973) is a German former professional tennis player.

She reached her career-high ranking of 330 in the world in 1995, with her only ITF singles title coming that year, in a $10,000 tournament in Ratzeburg. As a doubles player, Timm won a further three ITF tournaments and twice competed in the doubles main draw of the WTA Tour event in Hamburg.

ITF Circuit finals

Singles: 4 (1 title, 3 runner-ups)

Doubles: 6 (3 titles, 3 runner-ups)

References

External links
 
 

1973 births
Living people
West German female tennis players
German female tennis players
Universiade medalists in tennis
Universiade bronze medalists for Germany
Medalists at the 1995 Summer Universiade
Medalists at the 1997 Summer Universiade